Ngiṉṯaka, also spelled Ngintaku, is a giant perentie lizard Ancestral Being from Aṉangu and Pitjantjatjara religion and mythology. It is associated with Angatja, an area along an important songline.

Ngiṉṯaka is one of the two major reptile Ancestral Beings associated with Uluru, the other being Milpali.

Myth 
Ngiṉṯaka's songline is known as Inma Ngiṉṯaka. It tells of his journey of the creation of over 500 km via a song whose stanzas follow his travels through the land. In the songline, Ngiṉṯaka is presented with human characteristics.

In the myth, Ngiṉṯaka travels from his home near the Western Australia border to the camp of another lizard tribe, near Oodnadatta, in search of a better grindstone. He stole the Anangu grindstone and carried it home, chased by the Anangu people. In one spot along his journey, he digs up tjanmatjas (bush onions), creating large boulders. As he traveled, he created many landforms in the Musgrave and Mann Ranges, vomiting up many different kinds of grass seeds and vegetable food as he went.

Geography 
According to mythology, Ngarutjaranya, the highest mountain in South Australia, is also Ngiṉṯaka as he rears up to look over the country. He is returning to his home in the west.

References

External links 
 MAKING TRACKS.  Key issues about the heritage of Australian routes and journeys
 Learning from the Land

Australian Aboriginal deities
Creator deities
Legendary reptiles